Joachim II was a Patriarch of the Bulgarian Orthodox Church in the mid 13th century. He is listed in the medieval Book of Boril as the third Patriarch presiding over the Bulgarian Church from Tarnovo, the capital of the Bulgarian Empire. Joachim II is also mentioned in a ktitor inscription in a rock monastery near the village of Troitsa on the territory of modern Shumen Plateau Nature Park. The church was consecrated in 1265 and was named after the Saints Nicholas and Andrew. Joachim II lead the Bulgarian Church during the reign of Emperor Konstantin Tih (r. 1257–1277).

References

Sources 
 

13th-century births
13th-century deaths
13th-century Bulgarian people
Patriarchs of Bulgaria
People from Veliko Tarnovo